Agaraea longicornis is a moth of the family Erebidae. It was described by Gottlieb August Wilhelm Herrich-Schäffer in 1855. It is found in Mexico, Guatemala, Panama, Costa Rica, Brazil and Paraguay.

References

Moths described in 1855
Phaegopterina
Moths of North America
Moths of South America